The Garia language of New Guinea may refer to:
The Garia dialect of Uare
The Garia dialect of Sumau